Ellice is a given name which may refer to:

Women 
 Ellice Eadie (1912–2001), Irish-born English barrister and civil servant
 Ellice Handy (1902–1989), Singaporean educator, education administrator and cookbook author
 Ellice Hopkins (1836–1904), English social campaigner and author
 Ellice Nosworthy (1897–1972), Australian architect, one of Australia's first female architects
 Ellice Pilkington (1869–1936), Irish women's activist and artist

Fictional characters
 Ellice Ceñidoza-Villarosa, a character in the 2020 TV series Ang sa Iyo Ay Akin

Men 
 Ellice Horsburgh (1870–1935), Scottish mathematician and engineer

See also 
 Alyce, a list of people with the given name
 Allyce Beasley (born 1954), American actress and comedienne
 Ellise Chappell (born 1992), English actress
 Ellyse Perry (born 1990), Australian female cricketer and footballer